DXZB is the callsign used in Zamboanga City:

 DXZB-FM, an FM radio station branded as Brigada News FM
 DXZB-TV, a TV radio station branded as TV13